Kanjuce is a settlement in the hills south of Svetina in the Municipality of Štore in eastern Slovenia. The area is part of the traditional region of Styria. It is now included with the rest of the municipality in the Savinja Statistical Region.

References

External links
Kanjuce on Geopedia

Populated places in the Municipality of Štore